Rendal is a former municipality in the old Hedmark county, Norway. The  municipality existed from 1838 until its dissolution in 1880 when it was divided into Ytre Rendal and Øvre Rendal. The administrative centre was the village of Bergset where Øvre Rendal Church is located.

History
The parish of Rendal was established as a municipality on 1 January 1838 (see formannskapsdistrikt law). This municipality was quite large, spanning  from the Østerdalen valley to the border with Sweden. During the 1870s, discussions began on dividing the large municipality. On 1 January 1880, the municipality of Rendal was split in two to create the municipalities of Øvre Rendal (population: 1,868) and Ytre Rendal (population: 1,661). Later, in 1965, a new Rendalen Municipality was established, but it did not have the same boundaries as the old Rendal municipality.

See also
List of former municipalities of Norway

References

Rendalen
Former municipalities of Norway
1838 establishments in Norway
1880 disestablishments in Norway